"Welcome to the Black Parade" is a song from American rock band My Chemical Romance's third studio album, The Black Parade (2006). It was released on September 12, 2006, as the album's lead single, with the studio version available on the band's Myspace on September 2, 2006. The music video for the single was recognized as MTV's "Greatest Music Video of the Century" in 2017. The song topped the UK Singles Chart, reached number nine on the US Billboard Hot 100 and was named one of the Rock and Roll Hall of Fame's Songs That Shaped Rock and Roll.

A demo of the song entitled "The Five of Us Are Dying" was included on their 2016 reissue album The Black Parade/Living with Ghosts.

Recording 
My Chemical Romance started writing the song since their start as a band, although in a different style. It was inspired and heavily influenced by Frank Sinatra's "My Way", was slower, and was called "The Five of Us Are Dying". The band did not include it in their first two albums due to their feeling it was incomplete. After moving to Los Angeles to make their third album, they added a fast punk beat, changed the lyrics, and altered the chords of the chorus. The recording process was "very complex" due to the many layers in the song but "fun", according to guitarist Ray Toro, who extolled the end result:

Toro used a Les Paul with a Seymour Duncan Phat Cat pickup. His Marshall DSL100 amplifier broke down during preproduction, so instead he used a Marshall JCM800 borrowed from producer Rob Cavallo. The JCM800 continued to be used for the recording sessions, since the band liked its loud and "ball[sy]" sound.

Music video 
The video for the single was directed by Samuel Bayer, known for his work with Nirvana and Green Day. The music video was released on September 26, 2006, in the UK and Canada, and was released on September 27, 2006, in the US. It was heavily played on MTV. It features the Patient (the main character of the album, played by Lukas Haas) dressed in a hospital gown, and being taken by death in the form of a "Black Parade". On the main float stands My Chemical Romance playing "Welcome to the Black Parade". Behind the float are dozens of masked figures.

The setting of the music video transitions from a hospital room to a surreal cityscape with ash-covered wreckage, black snow and destroyed buildings.

Tom Breihan of the Village Voice regarded the video as "revealing a new stage of [My Chemical Romance's] persona". He also ranked it 7th on the 10 best music videos of 2006.

All the costumes were designed by costume designer Colleen Atwood. The costumes have inspired outfits, such as Lil Nas X's during his 2022 Grammy's performance. Other artists that have referenced the marching band uniforms include Post Malone.

Promotion 
The song became the group's first number one in the UK on October 15, 2006, staying there for two weeks, and later rose to number one on the Modern Rock charts on October 26, 2006, where it would stay for seven weeks. It is the band's most enduring success and their highest-charting single to date on the Billboard Hot 100, peaking at number 9. The song ranked at number 17 on Rolling Stone's "The 100 Best Songs of 2006". It was nominated for the Kerrang! Award for Best Single. The song was made downloadable for Rock Band and Guitar Hero: Warriors of Rock. ITV used the song in a video montage in its final Formula One broadcast at the 2008 Brazilian Grand Prix, after losing the rights to broadcast F1 in 2009 and beyond to the BBC. The video featured several prominent F1 drivers (such as Nico Rosberg, Jenson Button, Rubens Barrichello, David Coulthard and Sebastian Vettel) as well as ITV presenters (and retired commentator Murray Walker) lipsynching to the song.

The song was also used by the Los Angeles Kings during the 2012 Stanley Cup Playoffs as part of a video intro at the team's home games. The song also opened the team's Stanley Cup Champions rally and banner raising ceremony at the Staples Center.

The song was featured in the season one finale of Apple TV's Mythic Quest.

The song was featured in the ending scene of the Netflix TV series Lucifer,and the opening scene to the film Clerks III.

Critical reception 
"Welcome to the Black Parade" received critical acclaim. Time magazine's Josh Tyrangiel ranked the song in his top 10 songs of 2006, calling it "audacious, goofy and insanely catchy attempt at merging "Bohemian Rhapsody" and "Born to Run" into a rock opera" and saying it was a sign of an "Us vs. Them moment in the generational divide". David Fricke from Rolling Stone praised Way's "full rock-hero tilt" singing of the vocal hook ("We'll carry on."). Entertainment Weekly positively compared the song to "Bohemian Rhapsody". The Village Voice said pollsters generally preferred the song to the album.

Chart performance 
The song debuted on the Billboard Hot 100 at number 71 for the chart week of September 30, 2006, becoming their highest debut for a single. It peaked at number 9 on the Hot 100 in its 17th and 18th week on the chart, becoming the band's first and only top ten Hot 100 hit. "Welcome to the Black Parade" became and currently is their highest-charting single, beating their 2005 single "Helena" at number 33, their second-highest-charting single. In addition, it topped Modern Rock Tracks for seven weeks in a row, and is the band's only number one on this chart to date. "I'm Not Okay (I Promise)" was their previous highest-charting single on Modern Rock Tracks, where it peaked at number 4.

In the UK, the single knocked Razorlight's "America" off the number one spot on October 15, 2006, after extensive airplay. The single was number 26 in the UK's top 40 singles of 2006, selling 169,000 units. The song was certified double platinum in the UK on August 26, 2022, representing sales of at least 1,200,000 copies.

Legacy 
The solo piano intro of the song, which opens on a single G5 note held for the duration of a half note, has become iconic due to the song's popularity, especially among fans of My Chemical Romance and the wider genre, where it is seen as an inside joke and nostalgic of the mid-2000s emo subculture. Andrew Lloyd Webber, for example, asked his Twitter followers what they thought when listening to the note, as a reference to the song. The note has been used to promote Emo-themed event Emo Fight as well as The Black Parade/Living with Ghosts, a reissue of The Black Parade.

Accolades

Track listing 
 All songs written by My Chemical Romance.
Version 1 (promotional CD)

Version 2 (CD and 7" vinyl)

Version 3 (7" vinyl)

Version 4 (CD)

Version 5 (digital download)

Version 6 (digital download)

Charts

Weekly charts

Year-end charts

Certifications

References

External links 
 

2006 singles
My Chemical Romance songs
Record Report Pop Rock General number-one singles
Number-one singles in Scotland
UK Singles Chart number-one singles
Music videos directed by Samuel Bayer
The Black Parade (rock opera)
Song recordings produced by Rob Cavallo
Reprise Records singles
2006 songs
Songs written by Gerard Way
Songs written by Frank Iero
Songs written by Ray Toro
Songs written by Mikey Way